Silli Stadium is a stadium  in Silli, which is 55 km from Ranchi, Jharkhand. It is mainly  used  for football matches.

Silli Stadium has a capacity of 20,000. It has synthetic turf. The synthetic surface was laid by the organisation who had laid the synthetic turf for the Salt Lake Stadium at Kolkata and many other major stadiums.

In 2013, Indian cricket team skipper Mahendra Singh Dhoni displayed his footballing skills as he scored a goal during a friendly match. He played a 35-minute friendly football match at former deputy chief minister Sudesh Mahto’s assembly constituency. He teamed up with Mahto to play against a local soccer academy team at the Silli stadium.

Dhoni and Mahto scored a goal each as their team swept past their young rivals 4–1 in the friendly tie before a capacity crowd.

Their counterpart team was led by the young player of Hazaribagh Aakash Raghuvanshi and Sumit Kerketta.

References

External links
 Stadium picture
 

Football venues in Jharkhand
Sports venues in Jharkhand
Ranchi district
Year of establishment missing